Aleksey Mikhalyov may refer to:
Aleksey Mikhalyov (footballer) (born 1983), Russian football player
Aleksey Mikhalyov (translator) (1944–1994), Russian translator